Giovanni Desideri or Giovanni Conte (died 1604) was a Roman Catholic prelate who served as Bishop of Rieti (1603–1604).

Biography
Giovanni Desideri was born in 1568 and ordained a priest on 15 March 1603.
On 16 Jun 1603, he was appointed during the papacy of Pope Clement VIII as Bishop of Rieti. On 6 July 1603, he was consecrated bishop by Girolamo Bernerio, Cardinal-Bishop of Albano, with Claudio Rangoni, Bishop of Piacenza, and Andrea Sorbolonghi, Bishop of Gubbio, serving as co-consecrators. He served as Bishop of Rieti until his death in 1604.

See also
Catholic Church in Italy

References

External links and additional sources
 (for Chronology of Bishops) 
 (for Chronology of Bishops) 

1568 births
1604 deaths
People from Norcia
17th-century Italian Roman Catholic bishops
Bishops appointed by Pope Clement VIII